Julieon Raeburn (born 18 September 1978 in Trincity) is a sprinter from Trinidad and Tobago who specializes in the 200 metres.

He attended the Abilene Christian University in the United States.

Achievements

References

External links
 
Best of Trinidad

1978 births
Living people
Abilene Christian University alumni
Trinidad and Tobago male sprinters
Olympic athletes of Trinidad and Tobago
Athletes (track and field) at the 2000 Summer Olympics
Athletes (track and field) at the 2004 Summer Olympics
Athletes (track and field) at the 2002 Commonwealth Games
Athletes (track and field) at the 2006 Commonwealth Games
Central American and Caribbean Games medalists in athletics
Commonwealth Games competitors for Trinidad and Tobago
Athletes (track and field) at the 2003 Pan American Games
Pan American Games competitors for Trinidad and Tobago